The Duinger Berg is a hill range, up to , in the Lower Saxon Hills and the district of Landkreis in the German state of Lower Saxony.

Location 
The Duinger Berg lies in the western part of the Leine Uplands, a northern section of the Lower Saxon Hills. Its highest summit is the Babenstein and it measures some 7.5 km in length. It is situated in the triangle formed by the settlements of Eime, Alfeld and Duingen and also lies between Deinsen and Lübbrechtsen to the north, Rott, Hoyershausen and Lütgenholzen to the east, Brunkensen to the southeast, Coppengrave to the south, Duingen to the southwest and Weenzen and Marienhagen to the northwest.

The main summit of the Duinger Berg is the Babenstein. A little further southeast is the Kikedal.

Northwest of the Duinger Berg is the ridge of the Thüster Berg, to the east is the Külf, southeast the Reuberg and west the knife-edge of the Ith, part of which lies within the Weser Uplands-Schaumburg-Hamelin Nature Park. The valley of the Glene, a southwestern tributary of the Leine leads to the Reuberg.

The B 240 runs past the Duinger Berg to the northwest. The B 3 runs by to the east.

Hiking 
Numerous forest tracks run over the Duinger Berg. One hiking trail runs over the crest of the ridge from Marienhagen to Brunkensen.

References 

Central Uplands
Hill ranges of Lower Saxony
Regions of Lower Saxony
Hildesheim (district)
Natural regions of the Weser-Leine Uplands